Sir Harry Charles Luke  (born Harry Charles Lukach; 4 December 1884 – 11 May 1969) was an official in the British Colonial Office. He served in Barbados, Cyprus, Transcaucasia, Sierra Leone, Palestine, Malta, the British Western Pacific Territories and Fiji. He is the author of some books on several of these countries.

Biography
Luke was born in London in 1884. His father, J.H. Luke (né Lukács) was an Austro-Hungarian, but later acquired American citizenship; his mother was a Polish Catholic of the minor nobility. Luke was educated at Eton College and at Trinity College, Oxford, of which he became an Honorary Fellow in 1952, and converted to Anglicanism.

Luke's first official appointment was as private secretary in Sierra Leone in 1908. He became aide-de-camp the following year, and briefly acted as Colonial Secretary for a few months. In 1911 he moved to Barbados to become private secretary to the Governor. He subsequently served as private secretary to the High Commissioner of Cyprus (1911–1912) and as commissioner of Famagusta (1918–1920). From 1909 to 1911 he was also a second lieutenant in the London Yeomanry.

During World War I, Luke served as Commander of the Royal Naval Volunteer Reserve on the Syrian Coast, and as a Political Officer on the staff of Admiral Sir Rosslyn Wemyss; for his services he was awarded the Italian medal for military valour.

In 1919 Luke was appointed Political Officer to the Admiral of the Fleet, Sir John de Robeck. In 1920 he spent six months (from April to September) as British Chief Commissioner in Transcaucasia (Georgia, Armenia, and Azerbaijan).

In 1921, he was assistant Governor of Jerusalem and was appointed a member of the Haycraft Commission, which was established by Sir Herbert Samuel to investigate the cause of the riot which started in Jaffa on 1 May that year, and into the affairs of the Orthodox Patriarchate of Jerusalem.

From 1924 to 1928 Luke held the post of Colonial Secretary of Sierra Leone. He was subsequently appointed to be the acting High Commissioner to the Government of Palestine. He assumed this position on 19 July 1928 and held it until 6 December 1928.

In August 1929, acting as deputy to Sir John Robert Chancellor, Luke attempted to mediate an agreement between Jewish and Arab leaders, without success. Later he was Lieutenant Governor of Malta (1930–1938) and Governor of Fiji and High Commissioner of the British Western Pacific Territories from 1938 to 1942. He left Fiji on 20 July 1942.

On his retirement from the Colonial Service in 1943, Luke served for three years as chief representative of the British Council in the Caribbean. He died in Cyprus, where he often spent the winter, on 11 May 1969.

A Freemason of the United Grand Lodge of England, in 1919–1920 he served as the 28th First Principal of the St. Paul's  Royal Arch Chapter N. 2277 E. C. in Cyprus.

Family
In 1918 Luke married Joyce Evelyn Fremlin, the daughter of Henry James Leigh Fremlin and his wife, Maud Evelyn Deane (divorced 1949). They had two sons, Peter Ambrose Cyprian Luke, born in 1919, and Michael Charles Deane Luke, born in 1925.

Honours
  CMG (1926), Knight (1933), Knight Commander of the Order of St Michael and St George (1939)
 GCStJ (1960), Bailiff Grand Cross of the Order of St John

Luke's published works
 The Fringe of the East. Journey through Past and Present Provinces of Turkey, (Macmillan & Co), 1913 (First published under the name Harry Charles Lukach)
 The City of the Dancing Dervishes, 1914
 Cypriote Shrines, (Faith Press), 1920
 The Handbook of Cyprus (London), 1920 (together with D.J. Jardine)
 Cyprus under the Turks 1571–1878, (Oxford University Press), 1921
 Report of the commission appointed by the government of Palestine to inquire into the affairs of the orthodox patriarchate of Jerusalem, 1921 (together with Anton Bertram)
 The handbook of Palestine, 1922 (together with Edward Keith Roach)
 Anatolica, (London), 1924
 Mosul and its minorities, 1925
 Prophets, Priests and Patriarchs: sketches of the sects of Palestine and Syria, 1927
 In the Margin of History, 1933
 An Eastern Checkerboard, 1934
 More Moves on an Eastern Checkerboard, 1935
 The Making of Modern Turkey, (Macmillan & Co), 1936
 The British Pacific islands, 1944
 From a South Seas Diary, 1938–1942, 1945
 "Aden", in: The British Empire, by Hector Bolitho, 1948.
 Malta, an account and an appreciation, 1949
 Caribbean Circuit, 1950
 Aegean, Cyprus, Turkey, Transcaucasia and Palestine (1914–1924), 1953
 Cities and Men: an autobiography – Vols. 1 & 2, 1953
 Queen Salote and her Kingdom, 1954
 The Tenth Muse: A Gourmet's Compendium, 1954 (a cookery book)
 The Old Turkey and the New: from Byzantium to Ankara, 1955 (First published in 1936 under the title The Making of Modern Turkey)
 Cities and Men: an autobiography, Vol. 3, 1956
 Cyprus: a Portrait and an Appreciation, (Harrap), 1957

|-

See also
List of Governors of Fiji
British Mandate of Palestine#British High Commissioners for Palestine

Notes

References

Sources

External links

Papers of Sir Harry Charles Luke at the Bodleian Library, Oxford
Peerage page
Rulers of Fiji 
Picture of Harry Luke in Palestine

1884 births
1969 deaths
Governors of Fiji
British High Commissioners of Palestine
Knights Commander of the Order of St Michael and St George
Bailiffs Grand Cross of the Order of St John
British people of Hungarian descent
British people of Polish descent
Alumni of the University of Oxford
High Commissioners for the Western Pacific
British expatriates in Malta
Civil servants from London
Writers from London
Royal Naval Volunteer Reserve personnel of World War II
British people of American descent
British expatriates in Cyprus
Colonial Secretaries of Sierra Leone
Freemasons of the United Grand Lodge of England